"Someone Somewhere In Summertime" is a song by Simple Minds released as the third single from the album New Gold Dream (81–82–83–84) in 1982. Its performance in the UK Singles Chart was significantly poorer than the band's two previous hits, peaking at no. 36 and charting for 5 weeks. Nonetheless, it has become a live favourite. and acclaimed as one of the album's most popular tracks.

The song also charted in Ireland, peaking at number 19.

Mel Gaynor was the drummer for the song, with Kenny Hyslop and Mike Ogletree being the other session drummers for New Gold Dream (81–82–83–84). No promotional video was made for the song's release, as the band were preparing for a forthcoming tour of the UK.

Title
There are minor historical discrepancies regarding the song's exact title. The original album version of New Gold Dream (81–82–83–84) in 1982 lists the opening track as "Someone Somewhere in Summertime", whereas the single release titled the song as "Someone Somewhere (In Summertime)" on the front cover. The 2001 compilation album The Best of Simple Minds uses this exact title, while the 2003 DVD release "Seen The Lights: A Visual History" lists the song as "Someone, Somewhere (In Summertime)".

Style
Although a new wave track in the same genre as the band's previous two singles, "Someone Somewhere In Summertime" is noticeably different in terms of melodic effect. Described by AllMusic's Dave Thompson as an "introspective" track with a "dreamy atmosphere", the song is generally seen as taking a gentler and more delicate turn that, as the title suggests, evokes a yearning nature. This can be seen where the song demonstrates imagining blissful or ecstatic scenes in the line: "Moments burn, slow burning golden nights, once more see city lights".

In a 2008 interview Jim Kerr said of the song: "I think the Someone Somewhere (In Summertime) songwriting craft (...) gives the feeling that we'd arrived - that we'd reached some kind of maturity."

Critical reception
Similarly to "Promised You a Miracle" and "Glittering Prize", "Someone Somewhere in Summertime" has received positive acclaim, praised by AllMusic's MacKenzie Wilson for its ability for "tapping into internal emotion". A Rolling Stone review in 2003 described the "lush" and "erotic" song as one of the album's strongest and more "tuneful" tracks. A Q magazine special in January 2005 stated the song as opening New Gold Dream (81–82–83–84) in "magisterial fashion. Charlie Burchill's Edge-like guitar descended across Mick McNeil's textured keyboards, creating a ravishing sense of wonder."  Cash Box praised the way the music and the words fit together, with the "barren mood mirrored by stark guitar work and synthesizers" supporting the lyrics about the singer looking for someone with whom "to share his solitary psychic state."

More recent reviews of the song, especially live, have also been positive. The Independents Simon Price describes "Someone Somewhere in Summertime" as "an unimpeachable highlight, starting 100ft above the ground and never coming down to earth.". The Guardian'''s Dave Simpson also complimented the track, labelling it as "a waltz through a mythical August haze" and describing its parent album as a "shimmering masterpiece".

"Someone Somewhere in Summertime" has been sampled on the song "The World Is Mine" by French producer David Guetta.

Bono of U2 picked "Someone Somewhere in Summertime" as one of his chosen records on Desert Island Discs'' on BBC Radio 4 first broadcast on 26 June 2022.

Charts

References

1982 singles
1982 songs
Simple Minds songs
Virgin Records singles